Gina Kay Abercrombie-Winstanley (born 1957) is an American diplomat who served as U.S. ambassador to Malta from 2012 to 2016. She was nominated by President Barack Obama and confirmed on March 29, 2012. She was sworn in on April 18, 2012, and presented her credentials to George Abela, President of Malta, on May 2, 2012. On April 12, 2021 she was sworn in to serve as chief diversity and inclusion officer for the United States Department of State.

Early life and education
Abercrombie-Winstanley was born Gina Kay Abercrombie in Cleveland Heights, Ohio, where her mother was a secretary and her father an attorney. She graduated from Cleveland Heights High School and participated in an international exchange program in Israel. She then attended George Washington University, where she earned a Bachelor of Arts degree. She also earned a Master of Arts degree in international relations from Johns Hopkins University.

Career

After completing her studies, Abercrombie-Winstanley joined the Peace Corps as a volunteer in Oman.

Abercrombie-Winstanley joined the United States Foreign Service in 1985 and was posted to Baghdad, Iraq. She then went on to serve at the U.S. embassies in Jakarta, Indonesia and Cairo, Egypt. She returned stateside to become a Special Assistant for Middle Eastern and African Affairs to Deputy Assistant Secretary of State Lawrence Eagleburger (1991–1993). After a year of intensive Arabic language training in Tunisia, Abercrombie-Winstanley then became a political officer at the U.S. Embassy in Tel Aviv, Israel (1994–97), focusing on Israel–Palestine relations. from 1997 to 1998 she was assigned to the Senate Foreign Relations Committee.

From 1998 to 2000, she served in roles with the United States National Security Council, serving as director for the Arabian Peninsula with the Near East South Asia Center and later as director of legislative affairs.

Abercrombie-Winstanley served as consul general in Jeddah, Saudi Arabia from 2002 to 2005. She was the first female consul general in that location. While there, she survived an al-Qaeda attack on the consulate on December 6, 2004, and was cited "for acts of courage" during the attack. From 2005 to 2006, she served as director of Middle East Area studies in the Foreign Service Institute, and then spent two years as director for Egypt, Syria, Lebanon and Jordan at the Bureau of Near Eastern Affairs. From 2008 to 2012, she was deputy coordinator for counterterrorism.

In 2012, President Barack Obama nominated her to become U.S. ambassador to Malta. She served in that role from May 2, 2012, to January 26, 2016.

Abercrombie-Winstanley was sworn in April 12, 2021 to serve under Secretary Antony Blinken as chief diversity and inclusion officer for the United States Department of State

Personal life
Abercrombie-Winstanley married Gerard A. Winstanley in 1982, and they have two adult children.

Honors and awards
Recipient of Senior Performance Pay, Meritorious and Superior Honor Awards, including "For acts of courage during an attack on the U.S. Consulate General, Jeddah, Saudi Arabia on December 6, 2004 by al-Qa'ida terrorists."

References

External links

1957 births
Ambassadors of the United States to Malta
American expatriates in Israel
American expatriates in Oman
American expatriates in Saudi Arabia
American women ambassadors
African-American diplomats
Elliott School of International Affairs alumni
Paul H. Nitze School of Advanced International Studies alumni
Living people
Peace Corps volunteers
People from Cleveland Heights, Ohio
United States Foreign Service personnel
Cleveland Heights High School alumni
African-American Catholics